Vivek Gopan (born 3 April 1983) is an Indian television actor who works in the Malayalam soap operas. He is one among the popular players of Celebrity Cricket League's team Amma Kerala strikers.

Biography
Vivek was born to Gopakumar and Mangaladevi. He has a sister Devika.  He is married to Sumi and has a son Sidharth.

Political career 

In February 2021, Vivek Gopan joined Bharatiya Janata Party and is the party's candidate for 2021 Kerala Legislative Assembly election from Chavara constituency in Kollam district. He came third.

Television

TV shows

Filmography
Oru Marubhoomikkadha (2011)
Thalsamayam Oru Penkutty (2012)
Ee Adutha Kalathu (2012)
Kamaal Dhamaal Malamaal (2012)
Nakhangal (2013)
My Fan Ramu (2013)
Kamaal Dhamaal Malamaal (2013) 
 Loka Samastha (2015)
Acha Dhin (2015)
Thinkal Muthal Velli Vare (2015)
Shyam (2016)
Karinkunnam 6's (2016)
Pullikkaran Staraa (2017)
Oru Kuttanadan Blog (2018)
Kalikoottukar (2019)
Namaste India (2019)
Vritham (2020)
One (2021)

References

External links
 

1983 births
Living people
Male actors in Malayalam television
Male actors in Malayalam cinema
Bharatiya Janata Party politicians from Kerala